Grand Rapids Airport may refer to:
Gerald R. Ford International Airport (IATA: GRR) near Grand Rapids, Michigan, USA
Grand Rapids–Itasca County Airport (IATA: GPZ) near Grand Rapids, Minnesota, USA
Grand Rapids Airport (TC LID: CJV8) near Grand Rapids, Manitoba, Canada